Itala Mela (28 August 1904 – 29 April 1957) was an Italian Roman Catholic who was a lapsed Christian until a sudden conversion of faith in the 1920s and as a Benedictine oblate assumed the name of "Maria della Trinità". Mela became one of the well-known mystics of the Church during her life and indeed following her death. She also penned a range of theological writings that focused on the Trinity, which she deemed was integral to the Christian faith.

Mela was proclaimed to be Venerable on 12 June 2014 after Pope Francis approved her life of heroic virtue. On 14 December 2015 the pope also approved a miracle attributed to her intercession which allowed for her beatification to take place. Mela was beatified in La Spezia on 10 June 2017 and Cardinal Angelo Amato presided over the celebration on the pope's behalf; the miracle in question concerned the revival of an Italian newborn, whose body was in state of clinical brain death.

Life
Itala Mela was born on 28 August 1904 in La Spezia to Pasquino Mela and Luigia Bianchini; both were atheist teachers. She spent her childhood in the care of her maternal grandparents from 1905 to 1915 as her parents worked and her grandparents prepared Mela for her First Communion and Confirmation; she made both on 9 May 1915 and 27 May 1915 respectively.

The death of her brother Enrico at the age of nine (27 February 1920) challenged Mela's perception of her Christian faith, and she wrote of her feelings to the loss: "After his death, nothing". As a result, she eschewed her Christian faith and slipped into atheism. However she had a sudden reawakening of her faith on the Feast of the Immaculate Conception (8 Dec. 1922) after rediscovering God; her faith deepened with the motto she took being: "Lord, I shall follow You unto the darkness, unto death".

Mela became a member of FUCI in 1923, where she met future pope Giovanni Battista Montini and Alfredo Ildefonso Schuster at the meetings there; she also met the priests Divo Barsotti and Agostino Gemelli. At such meetings, Montini and both the politicians Aldo Moro and Giulio Andreotti served as major influences upon her. She was the main friend of Angela Gotelli, a teacher of classic letters and a Roman Catholic partisan who was close to the polical ideas of Aldo Moro.

Mela passed her studies in 1922 with recognition of being a brilliant student and was enrolled at the University of Genoa on the following 11 November, where she later received a degree in letters in 1928 as well as in classical studies.

Mela experienced her first vision of God on 3 August 1928 as a beam of light at the tabernacle in a church of a seminary at Pontremoli, beginning a long stream of visions in her life. She departed for Milan at this time, and chose as her confessor Adriano Bernareggi. Her true calling as a Benedictine oblate came in 1929 and solidified to the point where she commenced her novitiate. It concluded on 4 January 1933 when she made her profession in Rome in the church of San Paolo fuori le Mura making her four vows. As a sign of her new life, Mela assumed the name of "Maria della Trinità". Mela returned to her hometown in 1933. From 1936 she received ecstasies and visions. Her mother died in 1937.

Mela presented an idea for a memorial to Pope Pius XII in 1941, and the pope accepted the Memorial of Mary of the Trinity. In Genoa from 5–15 October 1946, Mela composed a series of spiritual exercises for the benefit of the faithful; the exercises were well received.

Mela died on 29 April 1957; her remains were later transferred to the La Spezia Cathedral in 1983.

Beatification
The beatification process started in La Spezia in its diocese on 29 April 1968 which granted Mela the title Servant of God; the process spanned until 21 November 1976 and was validated in Rome on 2 October 1992. In 1983, at the canonical reconnaissance that are regularly carried out in the case of beatification processes, his body was found intact. Following the local process, all of Mela's writings were approved in 1979 and permitted for evaluation in the cause.

The Positio then was compiled and submitted in 2003 to the Congregation for the Causes of Saints for further evaluation. It was on 12 June 2014 that Pope Francis approved that Mela had lived a life of heroic virtue thus declared her to be Venerable.

On 14 December 2015, the pope also approved a miracle attributed to the intercession of Mela which would allow for her beatification to take place; it was celebrated at Piazza Europa in La Spezia on 10 June 2017 with Cardinal Angelo Amato presiding over the celebration on the pope's behalf. The following afternoon after his Angelus address - given on the Solemnity of the Most Holy Trinity - Pope Francis referred to her beatification in which he mentioned the real presence of "God the Father, Son and Holy Spirit who abides in the chamber of our heart".

The current postulator assigned to this cause is Dr. Andrea Ambrosi. Her writings altogether occupy more than 42 volumes.

The Trinitarian indwelling
The Trinitarian indwelling is a spiritual experience proposed by Itala Mela to help the faithful live their lives in the light of the Trinity. It consists of trying to do everything in union with the Father, the Son and the Holy Spirit, relying on their guidance and always trying to do God's will.

Trinitarian indwelling is an experience that can be lived in any situation of life, not just in a convent or in a place of prayer. For Itala Mela, in fact, daily life is the place where it is possible to meet God and bear witness to one's faith, through concrete gestures of love and charity towards others.

the Trinitarian indwelling finds foundation in the Gospel according to John, chapter 10, verses from 22 to 39 and in particular in the words "The Father is in me and I in Him". Thus, the three divine Persons inhabit each other. According to Itala Mela, man, created in the image and likeness of God, is made to live the same life as God through the Trinitarian indwelling of the soul and body. It is not a mere intellectual fact, but an experience that concerns the person in his entirety of soul and body. Anyone who coherently lives as a Son of God can also experience this communion of love with God and with his neighbour.

Itala Mela lived its first experiences of trinitarian indwelling after having prayed the Office of the Hours, received the Eucharist during holy mass or having practiced an intense Eucharistic adoration.

Itala Mela immolated herself, offering her joyful suffering and infirmity to God so that other people could experience the Trinitarian indwelling, for the forgiveness of their sins and their eternal salvation.

The Trinitarian indwelling theology was also described by Elizabeth of the Trinity. It was anticipated by the Diuturnum illud of Pope Leo XIII and then confirmated by the encyclical Mystici corporis of Pius XII.

References

External links
Hagiography Circle
Santa Maria del Mare
Saints SQPN

1904 births
1957 deaths
20th-century venerated Christians
20th-century Christian mystics
20th-century Italian Roman Catholic theologians
Roman Catholic mystics
20th-century Italian Roman Catholic religious sisters and nuns
Benedictines
Italian beatified people
People from La Spezia
Beatifications by Pope Francis
University of Genoa alumni
Venerated Catholics by Pope Francis
Women mystics